J.D. Walter  (born July 2, 1967 in Abington, Pennsylvania) is a jazz vocalist.

Career 
Walter grew up in Lebanon, Pennsylvania. Beginning in 1985, he studied jazz vocals at the University of North Texas, then the Conservatory for the Arts in Amsterdam, Netherlands. In the 2000s, he taught at the University of the Arts in Philadelphia.

He released his first and second albums in 2000. The DownBeat reviewer of his One Step Away album wrote that Walter had "built a reputation for going down his own idiosyncratic path, while simultaneously crafting music that's at once accessible and adventuresome, and undeniably soulful." That album was recorded with guitarist Marvin Sewell, pianist Orrin Evans, bassist Eric Revis, and drummer Nasheet Waits.

Discography
 Sirens in the C-House  (Dreambox Media, 2000)
 Clear Day (Double-Time, 2001)
 2Bass, a Face and a Little Skin (Dreambox, 2004)
 Dedicated to You  with the Steve Rudolph Trio (PACT, 2004)
 Live in Portugal (Jwal, 2008)
 Live at the 55 Bar (Jwal & 55bar, 2009)
 One Step Away (Jwal, 2013)

References

External links
 J.D. Walter's official website

American jazz singers
1967 births
Living people
University of the Arts (Philadelphia) faculty
Double-Time Records artists